Robledo is a village and alqueria located in the municipality of Casares de las Hurdes, in Cáceres province, Extremadura, Spain. As of 2020, it has a population of 32.

Geography 
Robledo is located 185km north of Cáceres, Spain.

References

Populated places in the Province of Cáceres